National Highway 69A (NH 69A), was a National Highway in India that ran entirely within the state of Madhya Pradesh. The western terminal was in Multai and the eastern terminal was in Seoni. The length of the highway NH 69 A was 158 km.

New numbering 
Due to a notification from Ministry of Road Transport and Highways, NH 69A has been renumbered as National Highway 347.

Major cities en route 
Multai, Chhindwara, Chaurai Khas and Seoni.

References

See also
List of National Highways in India (by Highway Number)
National Highways Development Project

National highways in India (old numbering)
69 A